The Institute for Advanced Study (IAS) is a private institution in Princeton, New Jersey, designed to foster research by scientists in a variety of fields without the complications of teaching or funding, or the agendas of sponsorship. The IAS uses the word faculty in a special way and denotes a lifetime appointment.  Although they do not teach classes (because there are no classes at IAS), faculty hold the title of Professor, and often give lectures and direct research.  

This list includes current and former Faculty members, and their dates of tenure at the Institute.

References

Institute for Advanced Study